Pawliczka  is a village in the administrative district of Gmina Rzeczniów, within Lipsko County, Masovian Voivodeship, in east-central Poland.

See also
Karolina Pawliczak (born 1976), Polish lawyer and politician

References

Pawliczka